WFCF (88.5 FM) is a radio station broadcasting an eclectic college radio format. Licensed to St. Augustine, Florida, United States.  The station is owned by Flagler College.  The Federal Communications Commission originally issued the WFCF callsign on November 5, 1992. WFCF airs a college radio format, with multiple forms of music and speech.

References

External links

FCF
Radio stations established in 1993
1993 establishments in Florida
Flagler College